"Dime Si Te Vas Con Él" (English: Tell Me If You Go With Him) is the first single from Flex featuring another fellow Panamanian Mr. Saik, second studio album La Evolución Romantic Style, "Dime Si Te Vas Con Él" is quickly placed in the top positions globally, following the success of their debut single "Te Quiero". On March 26, 2009 Flex and Pee Wee sang this song along with "Escápate" in Premios Lo Nuestro 2009.

Music video
The music video was filmed in Panama. It tells the story of a humble employee, played by Flex, that after having an affair with a beautiful girl in town, go away to be conquered by the love of a rich man.

Track listing
Promo CD (Released on November 29, 2008)
"Dime Si Te Vas Con Él" (US Version) - 3:56

Charts

References

Flex (singer) songs
2009 singles
Songs written by Flex (singer)
2009 songs
EMI Latin singles